Highway 118 (AR 118, Ark. 118, and Hwy. 118) is a designation for two state highways in the Upper Arkansas Delta. One route of  begins at US Highway 64 (US 64) and Highway 149 east to Mississippi County Road 495 (CR 495) near the Mississippi River levee. A second route of  runs from US 70/US 79 in West Memphis to US 64 in Marion. Both routes are maintained by the Arkansas State Highway and Transportation Department (AHTD).

Route description

Earle to Joiner

Highway 118 begins at US 64 in the northeast corner of Earle within Crittenden County in the Arkansas Delta. The route runs northeast to Heafer, where it has an intersection with Highway 42 before curving due north and running as a section line road and entering Poinsett County.

Entering Poinsett County, Highway 118 runs north to Highway 322, which serves as a frontage road for Interstate 555 in southern Tyronza. Highway 118 meets I-555 at an exit before entering downtown Tyronza. The highway passes three historic properties and continues north before turning due east and entering Mississippi County.

Now heading west, AR 118 meets AR 135, AR 308, and AR 77 before crossing Interstate 55. After I-55, AR meets US 61 in Joiner. The route continues east to Black Cat, the Mississippi River and Tennessee.

West Memphis to Marion
Highway 118 begins at US 70 in West Memphis near Mid-South Community College. The route heads north to an interchange with Interstate 40 (I-40), as well as unsigned US 79. The highway continues north to Marion, running along the western city limits before an intersection with US 64.

Major intersections

See also

 List of state highways in Arkansas

References

External links

118
Transportation in Crittenden County, Arkansas
Transportation in Poinsett County, Arkansas
Transportation in Mississippi County, Arkansas